"Are You Really Mine?" is a popular song. It was written by Al Hoffman, Dick Manning, and Hugo Peretti and Luigi Creatore and accompanied by With Hugo Peretti & His Orchestra. The best-known recording of the song was done by Jimmie Rodgers, charting at number 10 on the U.S. Billboard chart in 1958.

References

1958 songs
Songs written by Al Hoffman
Songs written by Dick Manning
Songs written by Hugo Peretti
Jimmie Rodgers (pop singer) songs
Songs written by Luigi Creatore